Toradora! is a Japanese light novel series written by Yuyuko Takemiya and illustrated by Yasu.  The series is published by ASCII Media Works under their Dengeki Bunko imprint.  Ten novels were released between March 2006 and March 2009.  The series has been licensed for English publication by Seven Seas Entertainment. A spin-off series, titled Toradora Spin-off!, ran for three volumes between May 2007 and April 2010.


Toradora!

Toradora Spin-off!

References

Toradora